Marine Mammal Science is a quarterly peer-reviewed scientific journal covering all topics about or related to marine mammals. It is published by Wiley-Blackwell on behalf of The Society for Marine Mammalogy. According to the Journal Citation Reports, the journal has a 2015 impact factor of 1.665.

References

External links
 

Mammalogy journals
Publications established in 1985
English-language journals
Quarterly journals
Wiley-Blackwell academic journals